Honduras will compete at the 2011 Pan American Games in Guadalajara, Mexico from October 14 to 30, 2011. Honduras will send 23 athletes and compete in nine sports.

Athletics

Honduras has qualified six athletes.

Men

Track and road events

Field events

Women

Track and road events

Equestrian

Honduras has qualified one athlete in equestrian.

Dressage

Judo

Honduras has qualified one athlete in the 60 kg men's category.

Men

Repechage Rounds

Racquetball

Honduras has qualified two male athletes in racquetball.

Men

Rowing

Men

Swimming

Honduras has qualified five swimmers.

Men

Women

Taekwondo

Honduras has qualified two athletes in the 49 kg women's and +80 kg men's categories.

Men

Women

Weightlifting

Honduras has qualified one male athlete in weightlifting and has received a wildcard to send one female athlete.

Wrestling

Honduras has qualified one athlete in the 96 kg men's freestyle category and one athlete in the 96 kg men's Greco-Roman category, and received one wild card for the 66 kg freestyle men's event.

Men
Freestyle

Greco-Roman

References

Nations at the 2011 Pan American Games
P
2011